Lavo may refer to:

 Lavo, one of the most important cities in the history of Thailand
 Lavo Kingdom
 Lavo Čermelj, Slovene physicist, political activist, publicist and author

See also 
 Lavos (disambiguation)